Charles Duncan Ebersol (born December 30, 1982) is an American television and film producer and director. Ebersol is best known as the co-founder of The Company with Justin Hochberg, executive producer of USA Network's NFL Characters Unite and a co-producer of The Profit on CNBC. He is also the co-founder and CEO of the now-defunct Alliance of American Football.

In 2012, Ebersol was named by The Hollywood Reporter as one of Reality Television's 50 Most Powerful Producers.

Early life
Charlie Ebersol was born in Torrington, Connecticut, the son of actress Susan Saint James and senior television executive Dick Ebersol.

Plane crash
On November 28, 2004, during Charlie Ebersol's senior year at the University of Notre Dame, a private chartered jet carrying Dick Ebersol and his two sons Charlie and Teddy crashed during takeoff. Charlie rescued his father from the wreckage, but Charlie's younger brother, Teddy, along with the pilot and a flight attendant were killed. The injuries the Ebersols sustained in the plane crash were extensive; Dick Ebersol fractured six vertebrae, sternum, three ribs, pelvis, and coccyx, and Charlie Ebersol burned his arm and suffered a less severe back injury. Charlie Ebersol returned to Notre Dame shortly after the plane crash to finish his senior year and graduated with a Bachelor of Arts degree on May 15, 2005.

Early projects
While studying at Notre Dame, Ebersol created his first documentary entitled Ithuteng: Never Stop Learning in 2006. The movie received critical acclaim, winning the Toronto International Film Festival's first OneXOne award and inspired Oprah Winfrey to donate $1.14 million to the Ithuteng Trust School. He produced the documentaries Don't Look Down, about the life of Olympian Shaun White after he won Olympic Gold in 2006, and Tradition Never Graduates, a film about Notre Dame Football.

In 2009, Ebersol formed and sold Saint James Films and also co-created and executive produced NBC's The Wanted, a primetime show in which Ebersol and producing partner Adam Ciralsky led a team of former Navy Seals, a former UN Ambassador and a former Lieutenant Green Beret around the world in search of the most wanted terrorists and war criminals.

The Company
In 2011, Charlie Ebersol co-founded The Hochberg-Ebersol (THE) Company with Justin Hochberg and Mike Lanigan. Early projects included TNT's The Great Escape, executive produced with Bertram van Munster, Ron Howard and Brian Grazer, and History's Off the Grid: Million Dollar Manhunt.

Ebersol created USA Network's The Moment in 2013, a show hosted by Kurt Warner devoted to giving Americans a second chance to achieve their dreams. Ebersol was inspired to create the show after receiving his own second chance at life after surviving a plane crash in 2004. Ebersol co-created and executive produced NFL Characters Unite, a yearly television special with USA Network and The Profit on CNBC. In 2013 he worked with Dolph Lundgren on the Reelz competition show Race to the Scene. 

The production company changed its name from THE Company to The Company in 2013, upon the exit of Justin Hochberg. Ebersol's stated mission with The Company is to bring "Joy, Happiness, and Change…to the world through entertainment." In 2014, The Company announced a production and finance partnership with Israeli production house Dori Media. Ebersol executive produced The Untitled Yale Drama for USA Network along with Rob Reiner. 
 Ebersol directed This Was the XFL, a documentary in the 30 for 30 series about the XFL. He was chosen by ESPN to direct the documentary because of his father's co-founding of the league, and he used the longtime friendship between Dick and WWE chairman Vince McMahon as the centerpiece for the film.

Alliance of American Football 
In March 2018, Ebersol announced the creation of a new professional football league called the Alliance of American Football. The announcement was made at a press event at the Park Hyatt in Manhattan, and was streamed live on Facebook. Ebersol co-founded the league, which started playing in 2019, with former NFL executive and Pro Football Hall of Fame inductee Bill Polian. Ebersol's father, who co-founded rival league XFL and who led NBC Sports and created Sunday Night Football, sat on the league's board. The league was backed by investors such as Peter Thiel's Founders Fund, The Chernin Group and former NFL player Jared Allen, and employed coaches Mike Singletary, Brad Childress and Steve Spurrier as well as former NFL players including Justin Tuck, Hines Ward and Troy Polamalu who held executive roles. Games were played during the "off-season," from February to April, and aired on CBS, CBS Sports Network, NFL Network, TNT, B/R Live and the league's mobile app. After giving unilateral control of the league to Thomas Dundon, (owner of the Carolina Hurricanes NHL franchise) the league was suspended against the wishes of Ebersol and Polian. Eventually the league filed for Chapter 7 bankruptcy, and was closed permanently. Ebersol has since been accused of dishonesty and evasiveness regarding the league's financial matters.

In 2019, he was listed among the 40 Under 40 List put out by Connecticut Magazine.

Philanthropy
For his 30th birthday, Ebersol held a party entitled "Charlieland" benefiting Charity: Water, raising nearly $60,000 for the charity.

In 2014, Ebersol and The Company became entertainment partners of the veteran campaign Got Your 6 together with First Lady Michelle Obama and actor Bradley Cooper.

Personal life
On March 17, 2017, Ebersol announced via Twitter his engagement to Melody Brooke McCloskey, Founder and CEO of StyleSeat. On July 29, 2017, Ebersol and McCloskey were married at Blackberry Farm in Walland, Tennessee.

References 

Living people
American reality television producers
1982 births
People from Torrington, Connecticut
University of Notre Dame alumni
Survivors of aviation accidents or incidents
Jewish American philanthropists
Alliance of American Football executives
21st-century American Jews
Television producers from Connecticut